M2 Competition are a motorsport team based in New Zealand and Belgium.

History
Founded in 2010, M2 Competition began partaking in the New Zealand-based single-seater championship the Castrol Toyota Racing Series in 2010, with Ivan Lukashevich taking the team's first win at Manfield. The following year, the team achieved their second victory and first pole position from Jordan King at Taupo. In 2013, the team saw their first champion crowned with Nick Cassidy claiming his second successive title. Since then, the team has taken Lance Stroll, Lando Norris, Robert Shwartzman and Liam Lawson to the TRS title as well as fielding the likes of Earl Bamber, Alex Lynn, Raffaele Marciello, Marcus Armstrong and Richard Verschoor.

In November 2018, it was announced M2 would expand into Europe by competing in the 2019 Formula Renault Eurocup championship under a Belgian license.

Current series results

Toyota Racing Series / Formula Regional Oceania Championship

Former series results

Formula Renault Eurocup

F4 Spanish Championship

Toyota Finance 86 Championship

British GT Championship

Timeline

References

External links
 

New Zealand auto racing teams
Auto racing teams established in 2010
2010 establishments in New Zealand
Formula Renault Eurocup teams
Belgian auto racing teams
British GT Championship teams
Formula Regional teams